Mosso was a comune (municipality) of the Province of Biella in the Italian region Piedmont, located in the Biellese Prealps about  northeast of Turin and about  northeast of Biella. It was formed in 1998 by the fusion of the existing communes of Mosso Santa Maria and Pistolesa.

Physical geography 
Mosso bordered the following municipalities: Bioglio, Campiglia Cervo, Piatto, Quittengo, Trivero, Vallanzengo, Valle Mosso, Veglio.

Its population of about 1,700 was divided between numerous local centres. In addition to Mosso Santa Maria and Pistolesa, the commune's statute listed the following frazioni:
Mosso Santa Maria, Alloro, Bellaria, Bogino, Boschi, Brughiera, Buccio, Canova, Capomosso, Case Forno, Cerate, Crolle, Fantone, Ferchiani, Frieri, Garbaccio, Gianolio, Gili, Maioli, Marchetto, Mina, Mongiachero, Ometre, Oretto, Ormezzero, Piane, Quazza, Ramello, Ricca, Rivetto, Rolando, Sella, Sqisso, Taverna, Trabucco, Venalba;
and the following minor localities:
Artignana, Bochetto Luvera, Bochetto Margosio, Campazzo, Quattroventi, Casale ai Monti, Casale Picco, Curione, Gribaud, Molino dell’Avvocato, Molino Garaccio, Prapiano.

History 

Frazione Sella is known as the birthplace of Quintino Sella, academic, politician and founder of the Club Alpino Italiano. Until 1938 it was the seat of the commune of Valle Superiore Mosso, later incorporated into that of Mosso Santa Maria.

Mosso is one of the principal communes of the Comunità Montana Valle di Mosso and, together with the nearby commune of Valle Mosso, it suffered extensive damage in the floods of 1968 which affected the whole valley.

From 1 January 2019 Mosso was absorbed by the new-born municipality of Valdilana.

Population trends

References

Cities and towns in Piedmont
Former municipalities of the Province of Biella
Frazioni of Valdilana